Royal Air Force Topcliffe or RAF Topcliffe  is a Royal Air Force station in North Yorkshire, England. 

It was established as a RAF Bomber Command station in 1940. The British Army took over a large part of the site in 1974 and the airfield became an enclave within Alanbrooke Barracks. The last remaining RAF unit is No. 645 Volunteer Gliding Squadron which operates the Grob Viking T.1 glider.

History

Second World War 
Royal Air Force Topcliffe opened in September 1940 as a bomber station in RAF Bomber Command and was home to No. 77 Squadron and No. 102 Squadron, both flying the Armstrong Whitworth Whitley heavy bomber. There was a decoy site at Raskelf. No. 419 Squadron and No. 424 Squadron of the Royal Canadian Air Force (RCAF) moved in flying Vickers Wellington bombers and later, the Handley Page Halifax III. On 1 January 1943 the station was transferred to No. 6 Group RCAF and became a training station. The station, along with sub-stations at Wombleton, Dalton and Dishforth was designated as No. 61 (Training) Base in late 1943.

Cold War 
No.1 Air Navigation School was located at Topcliffe between March 1957 & December 1961. The Air Electronics school arrived in January 1962 and from 1967 became the Air Electronics & Engineers School, flying the Vickers Varsity T.1.

From October 1964, the Northern Communications Squadron flew the Avro Anson C.19, replacing them with Beagle Basset CC.1 in 1965 before the squadron departed in 1969.

The Airman Aircrew Initial Training School was located at Topcliffe from January 1967 until February 1970.

No. 15 Aviation Flight of the Army Air Corps flew the de Havilland Canada DHC-2 Beaver AL.1 from the early 1970s and No. 666 Aviation Squadron AAC flew Westland Scout AH.1 helicopters between 1973 and 1978.

In 1974 much of the station was transferred to the British Army and became Alanbrooke Barracks.

During the 1980s, Topcliffe was home of the Royal Navy Elementary Flying School. In the 1990s it was temporarily home to a Shorts Tucano squadron of the RAF Central Flying School. It was the home of the Tucano Air Navigation Squadron, teaching student navigators of both the RAF and the Royal Navy until April 2002, when it moved to RAF Linton-on-Ouse.

During the 1990s and until 2001, the airfield was utilised by Merlin Parachute Club, home to both the 4th Battalion, Parachute Regiment parachute display team and the University of York Sport Parachute Club.

21st century 
No. 645 Volunteer Gliding Squadron moved to the airfield in 2003, after their previous home at the former RAF Catterick became increasingly unusable.

No. 635 Volunteer Gliding Squadron also operated from Topcliffe from 2009 when it moved from its former home at RAF Samlesbury. The unit disbanded in 2016 as part of the relaunch of air cadet aviation.

RAF Topcliffe was a satellite station which served in the role of a Relief Landing Ground for Shorts Tucano T1 aircraft of No. 1 Flying Training School previously based nearby at RAF Linton-on-Ouse (one of two, the other being Dishforth Airfield). No RAF personnel are based permanently at the airfield.

In 2012, Yorkshire Air Ambulance moved their second base to RAF Topcliffe from nearby Bagby Airfield.

Role and operations 
Since the British Army took over a large part of the site in 1974 to establish Alanbrooke Barracks, the airfield is now a small enclave within what is now known as Alanbrooke Barracks.

The last remaining RAF unit based at Topcliffe is No. 645 Volunteer Gliding Squadron, which teaches Air Cadets to fly the Grob Viking T1.

As of March 2012, the station is the permanent base of  G-YOAA one of the two Yorkshire Air Ambulances.

Based units
Units based at RAF Topcliffe.

Royal Air Force 
No. 22 Group (Training) RAF
 No. 2 Flying Training School
 No. 645 Volunteer Gliding Squadron
 Air Training Corps
 Central & East Yorkshire Wing HQ

Civilian 
 Yorkshire Air Ambulance - Airbus H145

See also 

 List of Royal Air Force stations

References

Citations

Bibliography

External links

 No. 645 Volunteer Gliding Squadron
 UK Military Aeronautical Information Publication – Topcliffe (EGXZ)

RAF Topcliffe
645 VGS
Topcliffe
Topcliffe
Topcliffe
Military history of North Yorkshire